The 2011 Empire Trnava Cup was a professional tennis tournament played on clay courts. It was the third edition of the tournament, part of the 2011 ITF Women's Circuit. It took place in Trnava, Slovakia between 1 and 7 August 2011.

WTA entrants

Seeds

 1 Rankings are as of July 25, 2011.

Other entrants
The following players received wildcards into the singles main draw:
  Klára Fabíková
  Michaela Frlicka
  Veronika Kolářová
  Nikola Vajdová

The following players received entry from the qualifying draw:
  Dijana Banoveć
  Viktorija Golubic
  Anna Karolína Schmiedlová
  Romana Tabak

Champions

Singles

 Yvonne Meusburger def.  Elitsa Kostova, 0–6, 6–2, 6–0

Doubles

 Janette Husárová /  Renata Voráčová def.  Jana Čepelová /  Lenka Wienerová, 7–6(7–2), 6–1

External links
ITF Search 

Empire Trnava Cup
Clay court tennis tournaments
Tennis tournaments in Slovakia
2011 in Slovak tennis